The Whitehead Prize is awarded yearly by the London Mathematical Society to multiple mathematicians working in the United Kingdom who are at an early stage of their career. The prize is named in memory of homotopy theory pioneer J. H. C. Whitehead.

More specifically, people being considered for the award must be resident in the United Kingdom on 1 January of the award year or must have been educated in the United Kingdom. Also, the candidates must have less than 15 years of work at the postdoctorate level and must not have received any other prizes from the Society.

Since the inception of the prize, no more than two could be awarded per year, but in 1999 this was increased to four "to allow for the award of prizes across the whole of mathematics, including applied mathematics, mathematical physics, and mathematical aspects of computer science".

The Senior Whitehead Prize has similar residence requirements and rules concerning prior prizes, but is intended to recognize more experienced mathematicians.

List of Whitehead Prize winners
 1979 Peter Cameron, Peter Johnstone
 1980 H. G. Dales, 
 1981 Nigel Hitchin, Derek F. Holt
 1982 John M. Ball, Martin J. Taylor
 1983 Jeff Paris, Andrew Ranicki
 1984 Simon Donaldson, Samuel James Patterson
 1985 Dan Segal, Philip J. Rippon
 1986 Terence Lyons, David A. Rand
 1987 Caroline Series, Aidan H. Schofield
 1988 S. M. Rees, P. J. Webb, Andrew Wiles
 1989 D. E. Evans, Frances Kirwan, R. S. Ward
 1990 Martin T. Barlow, Richard Taylor, Antony Wassermann
 1991 Nicholas Manton, 
 1992 K. M. Ball, Richard Borcherds
 1993 D. J. Benson, Peter B. Kronheimer, D. G. Vassiliev
 1994 P. H. Kropholler, R. S. MacKay
 1995 Timothy Gowers, Jeremy Rickard
 1996 John Roe, Y. Safarov
 1997 Brian Bowditch, Dominic Joyce
 1998 S. J. Chapman, Igor Rivin, Jan Nekovář
 1999 Martin Bridson, Nicholas Higham, Imre Leader
 2000 M. A. J. Chaplain, Gwyneth Stallard, Andrew M. Stuart, Burt Totaro
 2001 M. McQuillan, A. N. Skorobogatov, V. Smyshlyaev, J. R. King
 2002 Kevin Buzzard, Alessio Corti, Marianna Csörnyei, 
 2003 N. Dorey, T. Hall, Marc Lackenby, M. Nazarov
 2004 M. Ainsworth, Vladimir Markovic, Richard Thomas, Ulrike Tillmann
 2005 Ben Green, Bernd Kirchheim, Peter Topping
 2006 Raphaël Rouquier, Jonathan Sherratt, Paul Sutcliffe, Agata Smoktunowicz
 2007 Nikolay Nikolov, Oliver Riordan, Ivan Smith, Catharina Stroppel
 2008 Timothy Browning, Tamás Hausel, Martin Hairer, Nina Snaith
 2009 Mihalis Dafermos, Cornelia Druțu, Bethany Rose Marsh, Markus Owen
 2010 Harald Helfgott, Jens Marklof, Lasse Rempe-Gillen, Françoise Tisseur
 2011 Jonathan Bennett, Barbara Niethammer, Alexander Pushnitski
 2012 Toby Gee, Eugen Vărvărucă, Sarah Waters, Andreas Winter
 2013 Luis Fernando Alday, André Neves, Tom Sanders, Corinna Ulcigrai
 2014 Clément Mouhot, Ruth Baker, Tom Coates, Daniela Kühn and Deryk Osthus
 2015 Peter Keevash, James Maynard, Christoph Ortner, Mason Porter, Dominic Vella, David Loeffler and Sarah Zerbes
 2016 A. Bayer, G. Holzegel, Jason P. Miller, Carola-Bibiane Schönlieb
 2017 Julia Gog, András Máthé, Ashley Montanaro, Oscar Randal-Williams, Jack Thorne, Michael Wemyss
 2018 Caucher Birkar, Ana Caraiani, Heather Harrington, Valerio Lucarini, Filip Rindler, Péter Varjú
 2019 Alexandr Buryak, David Conlon, Toby Cubitt, Anders Hansen, William Parnell, Nick Sheridan
 2020 Maria Bruna, Ben Davison, Adam Harper, Holly Krieger, Andrea Mondino, Henry Wilton
 2021 Jonathan Evans, Patrick Farrell, Agelos Georgakopoulos, Michael Magee, Aretha Teckentrup, Stuart White
 2022 Jessica Fintzen, Ian Griffiths, Dawid Kielak, Chunyi Li, Tadahiro Oh, Euan Spence

See also
 Fröhlich Prize
 Senior Whitehead Prize
 Shephard Prize
 Berwick Prize
 Naylor Prize and Lectureship
 Pólya Prize (LMS)
 De Morgan Medal
 List of mathematics awards

References

External links
 Prize rules
 List of LMS prize winners

Awards established in 1979
British awards
Awards of the London Mathematical Society
Early career awards